Hermann Magerl (born 13 January 1949) is a former German athlete. He competed in the men's high jump at the 1972 Summer Olympics.

References

1949 births
Living people
Athletes (track and field) at the 1972 Summer Olympics
German male high jumpers
Olympic athletes of West Germany